This article lists the secretaries of Italian Fascist parties founded and led by Benito Mussolini between 1919 and 1945, namely Italian Fasces of Combat (FIC), National Fascist Party (PNF) and Republican Fascist Party (PFR).

The Secretaries were effective, day-to-day leaders of parties, while Mussolini was the overall (supreme) leader, as well as Duce of the Fascist-ruled Kingdom of Italy between 1922 and 1943, and the Nazi-dominated Italian Social Republic (RSI) between 1943 and 1945.

Secretaries

Italian Fasces of Combat

National Fascist Party

Republican Fascist Party

Timeline

See also 

 List of commanders of the Blackshirts

References 

Secretaries
Fascist parties secretaries
Italian Fascist parties secretaries
1919 establishments in Italy
1945 disestablishments in Italy